Pittville School is a coeducational foundation secondary school located in  the Pittville area of Cheltenham in the English county of Gloucestershire.

The school occupies the buildings and grounds formerly occupied by Pate's Grammar School for Girls;  the school was founded in 1986, when Pate's moved within Cheltenham as a result of a merger.

As a foundation school, Pittville is administered by Gloucestershire County Council. The school also has a specialism in the performing arts.

References

External links
Pittville School official website

Secondary schools in Gloucestershire
Schools in Cheltenham
Foundation schools in Gloucestershire